= International Cervical Cancer Foundation =

Non-profit organization

The International Cervical Cancer (INCCA) Foundation (INCCA) is a non-profit organization established in 2006 to improve the health and quality of life of Peruvian women through the primary and secondary prevention of female genital tract cancers, including cervical cancer, in an area that has one of the highest rates of cervical cancer in the world.
